The Visual Effects Society Award for Outstanding Animated Character in an Episode or Real-Time Project is one of the annual awards given by the Visual Effects Society, starting from 2002. Since its inception, the award's title has gone through several title changes, and one major category shift. First awarded in 2002, the award was titled "Best Character Animation in a Live Action Televised Program, Music Video or Commercial" and given to the best character animation in a televised program, with no specific character cited. This would change in 2004, when the category was re-titled "Outstanding Performance by an Animated Character in a Live Action Broadcast Program", and given to visual effects artists for work on a specified character. The category was again re-titled the following year, this time to "Outstanding Performance by an Animated Character in a Live Action Broadcast Program, Commercial, or Music Video". In 2008, it was titled "Outstanding Animated Character in a Live Action Broadcast Program or Commercial", but changed in 2014 to "Outstanding Performance of an Animated Character in a Commercial, Broadcast Program, or Video Game" and once again the next year to "Outstanding Animated Performance in an Episode, Commercial, or Real-Time Project". In the title changed to "Outstanding Animated Performance in an Episode or Real-Time Project" and, finally, in 2017 to "Outstanding Animated Character in an Episode or Real-Time Project"

Winners and nominees

2000s
Best Character Animation in a Live Action Televised Program, Music Video, or Commercial

Outstanding Performance by an Animated Character in a Live Action Broadcast Program

Outstanding Performance by an Animated Character in a Live Action Broadcast Program, Commercial, or Music Video

Outstanding Animated Character in a Live Action Broadcast Program or Commercial

Outstanding Animated Character in a Broadcast Program or Commercial

2010s

Outstanding Performance of an Animated Character in a Commercial, Broadcast Program, or Video Game

Outstanding Animated Performance in an Episode, Commercial, or Real-Time Project

Outstanding Animated Performance in an Episode or Real-Time Project

Outstanding Animated Character in an Episode or Real-Time Project

2020s
{| class="wikitable" width="95%" cellpadding="5"
! width="5%" | Year
! width="30%" | Program
! width="25%" | Character 
! width="33%" | Nominees
! width="8%" | Network
|-
| rowspan="4" style="text-align:center;" | 2020 || style="background:#B0C4DE;" |The Mandalorian: "Chapter 13: The Jedi" || style="background:#B0C4DE;" |The Child|| style="background:#B0C4DE;" |John Rosengrant, Peter Clarke, Scott Patton, Hal Hickel || style="background:#B0C4DE;" |Disney+|-
| The Crown: "The Balmoral Test" || Imperial Stag || Ahmed Gharraph, Ross Burgess, Gabriela Ruch Salmeron, Joel Best || Netflix
|-
| The Mandalorian: "Chapter 9: The Marshal" || Krayt Dragon || Paul Kavanagh, Zaini Mohamed Jalani, Michal Kriukow, Nihal Friedel || rowspan="2"|Disney+
|-
| Timmy Failure: Mistakes Were Made || Total || Maxime Masse, Hennadii Prykhodko, Luc Girard, Sophie Burie
|-
| rowspan="5" style="text-align:center;" | 2021 
| style="background:#B0C4DE;" |The Witcher: "A Grain of Truth || style="background:#B0C4DE;" |Nivellen the Cursed Man || style="background:#B0C4DE;" |Marko Chulev, Rasely Ma, Mike Beaulieu, Robin Witzsche || style="background:#B0C4DE;" |Netflix
|-
| Lisey's Story: "Lisey's Story" || The Long Boy || Mohsen Mousavi, Salauddin "Sallu" Kazi, Mattias Brunosson, Pablovsky Ramos-Nieves || Apple TV+
|-
| Love, Death & Robots: "Snow in the Desert" || Hirald || Maxime Luere, Zoé Pelegrin-Bomel, Laura Guerreiro, Florent Duport || rowspan="2"|Netflix
|-
| The Witcher: "What Is Lost" || Leshy Eskel || Hannes Faupel, Stéphane Paccolat, Ivan Cadena Ayala, Laurent Fortin
|-
| Y: The Last Man || Ampersand || Mike Beaulieu, Michael Dharney, Peter Pi, Aidana Sakhvaliyeva || FX on Hulu
|-
| rowspan="4" style="text-align:center;" | 2022 || style="background:#B0C4DE;" |The Umbrella Academy || style="background:#B0C4DE;" |Pogo|| style="background:#B0C4DE;" |Aidan Martin, Hannah Dockerty, Olivier Beierlein, Miae Kang || style="background:#B0C4DE;" |Netflix
|-
| She-Hulk: Attorney at Law || She-Hulk || Elizabeth Bernard, Jan Philip Cramer, Edwina Ting, Andrew Park || Disney+
|-
| Skull & Bones || Sam || colspan="2"| Jonas Skoog, Jonas Törnqvist, Goran Milic, Jonas Vikström
|-
| The Callisto Protocol || Jacob Lee || colspan="2"| Martin Contel, Glauco Longhi, Jorge Jimenez, Atsushi Seo
|}

Programs with multiple awards

3 awards
 Game of Thrones (HBO)
|}

Programs with multiple nominations

11 nominations
 Game of Thrones (HBO)

4 nominations
 Battlestar Galactica (Sci Fi)

2 nominations
 Doctor Who (BBC)
 The Witcher'' (Netflix)

References

External links
 Visual Effects Society

A
Awards established in 2002